Muhammad was an Islamic prophet and a religious and political leader who preached and established Islam.

Muhammad and variations may also refer to:

Muhammad (name), a given name and surname, and list of people with the name and its variations

Persons with the name Muhammad and no other name
Muhammad (Bavandid ruler), 13th-century Iranian monarch
Muhammad V of Kelantan (born 1969), 15th Yang di-Pertuan Agong and Sultan of Kelantan
Mohammed VI of Morocco (born 1963), King of Morocco
Muhammed VII, Sultan of Granada (1370–1408) 
Muhammad VII of Bornu of the Sayfawa dynasty (1731–1747)
Muhammed VIII, Sultan of Granada (1411–1431)
Mohammed VIII of Bornu of the Sayfawa dynasty (1811–1814)

Places
Mohammad-e Olya, a village in Fars Province, Iran
Mohammad, Gachsaran, a village in Kohgiluyeh and Boyer-Ahmad Province, Iran
Mohammad, Kohgiluyeh, a village in Kohgiluyeh and Boyer-Ahmad Province, Iran
Mohammad, Sistan and Baluchestan, a village in Sistan and Baluchestan Province, Iran

Other uses
Muhammad (book), a 1961 nonfiction book by Maxime Rodinson
Muhammad (teddy bear), a teddy bear involved in a blasphemy prosecution in the Sudan
Muhamed (horse)
Muhammad (sura), 47th sura of the Qur'an
Muhammad (2015 film), a film by Majid Majidi
Muhammad: The Last Prophet, an animated movie

See also
Mahomet (disambiguation), an alternate spelling of the name
Mohammad's Army, a guerrilla organization operating in Iraq
Mohammedia, a port city located 15 miles northeast of Casablanca in western Morocco